The Seal Sanctuary in Hel (Fokarium w Helu) is a public aquarium in the town of Hel at the Polish seaside of the Baltic Sea.

References

External links

Aquaria in Poland
Tourist attractions in Pomeranian Voivodeship
Buildings and structures in Pomeranian Voivodeship